Patriarch Gerasimus of Alexandria may refer to:

 Patriarch Gerasimus I of Alexandria, ruled in 1620–1636
 Patriarch Gerasimus II (Palladas) of Alexandria, Greek Patriarch of Alexandria in 1688–1710
 Patriarch Gerasimus III of Alexandria, ruled in 1783–1788